First Floor Power is an indie rock band from Sweden. FFP recorded and released their debut EP We Are the People in 2000 on the Swedish label Silence Records. In 2001 their debut album There is Hope was released. Swedish National TV produced a one-hour documentary about the band which focused on the struggle and attempts of the band in its early career. Their sound has been described as a combination of afrobeat and 70s pop music. The band was listed in the "ten albums of the year" in Time Out Magazine. 

Jenny Wilson left the band to pursue a solo career after the band's second album.

Discography

Albums
There Is Hope  CD (2001)
Nerves  CD (2003)
Don't Back Down  CD (2008)

Singles/EPs
We Are the People  CDM (2000)
Time Time (EP)  CDM (2000)
Love Will Come Knocking  CDS (2001)
The Covers  7" (2002)
Happy Endings CDM (2003)
The Jacket  12" (2008)

Members
Current
 Karl-Jonas Winqvist
 Sarah Wilson 
Per Lager

Past
Jenny Wilson

References

External links
 Myspace

Swedish indie pop groups
Musical groups established in 1997